Fjölnir may refer to the following:

 Fjölnir, a Swedish king according to Norse mythology
 Fjölnir (programming language)
 Fjölnir (journal), a former Icelandic-language journal published in Denmark
 Ungmennafélagið Fjölnir, an Icelandic sports club